Rebirth is a studio album by Billy Childs, released on March 24, 2017. The title references the return to his hard-bop playing of the 1970s.

The album earned Childs his fifth Grammy Award – his first for Best Jazz Instrumental Album.

Track listing 
"Backwards Bop" (Billy Childs) – 6:38
"Rebirth" (Childs, Claudia Acuña) – 7:38
"Stay" (Childs) – 5:59
"Dance of Shiva" (Childs) – 6:49
"Tightrope" (Childs) – 6:37
"The Starry Night" (Childs) – 8:10
"The Windmills of Your Mind" (Michel Legrand, Alan and Marilyn Bergman) – 7:10
"Peace" (Horace Silver) – 7:29

Source:

Personnel
Billy Childs – piano, producer
Steve Wilson – alto and soprano saxophone
Hans Glawischnig – acoustic bass
Eric Harland – drums
Claudia Acuña – vocals (on "Rebirth")
Alicia Olatuja – vocals (on "Stay")
Ido Meshulam – trombone (on "Rebirth")
Rogerio Boccato – percussion (on "Rebirth")
Gretchen Valade, Myles Weinstein – executive producers
Rich Breen – recording, mixing and mastering engineer
Nate Odden – assistant engineer

Source:

References

2017 albums
Grammy Award for Best Jazz Instrumental Album
Jazz albums by American artists